Schwetzochromis neodon is a species of rheophilic cichlid endemic to the Democratic Republic of the Congo where it is only known from the Fwa River in the Congo Basin.  It can reach a length of  SL. It is currently the only known member of its genus, but several others that formerly were included have been moved to Orthochromis.

References

External links 
 Photograph

Haplochromini
Fish of the Democratic Republic of the Congo
Endemic fauna of the Democratic Republic of the Congo
Taxa named by Max Poll
Fish described in 1948